Philip Bloom (born May 20, 1971) is a British filmmaker known for his DSLR filmmaking, blog and education. He has worked as a cinematographer and cameraman for Lucasfilm, CNN, Sky News and the BBC.

Career

He began his filmmaking career at Sky News, working for the broadcaster between 1989 and 2006 as a cameraman/editor. His recent credits include work with Lucasfilm, Discovery HD, Five, Living, Sky One, and more.

In 2009 he was called up by Rick McCallum to help shoot with Canon DSLRs on the set of Lucasfilm's Red Tails.

Bloom's 2011 documentary film How to Start a Revolution about Nobel Peace Prize nominee Gene Sharp premiered at the 27th annual Boston Film Festival and won Best Documentary, as well as the Mass Impact Award.  It also won Best Documentary at the Raindance Film Festival.

In 2012 he was the first cameraman using the novel Panasonic Lumix DMC-GH3 of the Micro Four Thirds system creating the film Genesis.

In 2013, Bloom created a short film for the "Pro Photographer, Cheap Camera Challenge" (created by website DigitalRev TV) in which photographers and filmmakers, who are used to working with advanced and expensive gear, are given cheap, often very low quality equipment to create an original work. Bloom was instructed to create a short film using the Video Girl Barbie, a Barbie doll released in 2010 which features an embedded video camera in its chest, boasting a 1.2MP camera and 240p recorded video.

In March 2014 his short film "Koh Yao Noi" won "Best Travel / Landscape Film" at the NYC Drone Film Festival.

His most recent work on CNN's The Wonder List with Bill Weir took him around the world.

Fundraising Work

Since 2008 Bloom has been fundraising for the Movember Foundation. To date he has raised over £250,000.

In 2011 his fundraiser for the Japan earthquake raised over $40,000. 

Also in 2011 his fundraiser for the Christchurch earthquake in New Zealand raised over $11,000. 

In 2018 Bloom made a number of documentaries to raise money for a cat charity on the Greek island of Skiathos. They reached their goal of €130,000 in November 2019 so they could buy their own land after being evicted from their original location.

Abuse Allegations

Allegations emerged on March 27, 2015, after Bloom posted a public message to his Facebook page condemning former Top Gear presenter Jeremy Clarkson for hitting one of its producers. Photographer Sarah Collaton, Bloom's former girlfriend, responded to the post on her Facebook page, calling Bloom an "abusive hypocrite." Former partner Sarah Estela then corroborated a similar experience in her relationship with Bloom in a response on Facebook. Bloom has denied the allegations.

References

Living people
1971 births